HMS Portland was a 50-gun fourth-rate ship of the line of the Royal Navy. Designed by Sir John Williams, it was first launched on 11 April 1770.

Issue with privateers 
During the American Revolution, the Portland captured the privateer ship known as the Hammond. This would result in the ship's captain, Thomas Dumaresq and flag officer Admiral James Young getting arrested by the Court of Vice-Admiralty at Antigua due to the tribunal of declaring the privateers as legal even without the proper paperwork. This resulted in a high-profile case surrounding Captain Thomas Dumaresq of the Portland that had the First Lord of the Admiralty, John Montagu, 4th Earl of Sandwich and King George III involved. Eventually after a deal between the British government and Antigua, charges were dropped.

References 

1770 ships
Individual sailing vessels
Ships of the line of the Royal Navy